The blackback barb (Enteromius barnardi) is a species of cyprinid fish native to Africa where it is known to occur in shallow, vegetated waters of the Zambezi River system, the Cunene River system and the Zambian portion of the Congo River system.  This species can reach a length of  SL.

The fish is named in honor of Keppel Harcourt Barnard (1887-1964) of the South African Museum, because of his contributions to the taxonomy of South African fishes.

It is also found in the aquarium trade.

References

blackback barb
Fish of Zambia
blackback barb
Taxa named by Reginald Arthur Jubb